Parotis pomonalis is a moth in the family Crambidae. It was described by Achille Guenée in 1854. It is found in China, India, Sri Lanka, Borneo, Sumbawa and Australia.

References

Moths described in 1854
Spilomelinae